"Numbers" is a song by American rapper A Boogie wit da Hoodie featuring fellow American rappers Roddy Ricch & Gunna and American producer London on da Track. The song was released on March 31, 2020 as the fifth single from the album Artist 2.0. This also serves as the rappers' second collaboration with one another individually. A Boogie wit da Hoodie and Gunna both appeared on Ricch's debut studio album, Please Excuse Me for Being Antisocial on the songs "Tip Toe" and "Start wit Me" respectively. A Boogie wit da Hoodie and Gunna also appeared alongside Dremo on Davido's song "Big Picture" on his second studio album, A Good Time.

The song became A Boogie's highest charting song, debuting and peaking at number 23 on the Billboard Hot 100. The song also debuted at number five on the Rolling Stone 100.

Background 
The song was originally an album track, released alongside the album on February 14, 2020. The song was later sent to US rhythmic contemporary radio on March 31, 2020 as the fifth single of the album.

Chart performance 
"Numbers" debuted and peaked at number 23 on the US Billboard Hot 100 chart on the week of February 28, 2020. This became A Boogie wit da Hoodie's highest charting song on the Hot 100. This song is London on da Track's highest charting song as a credited lead artist. In addition, the song debuted at number five on the Rolling Stone 100 earning 18.4 million streams in its first week. It charted with ten other songs  from "Artist 2.0", including "Me and My Guitar" and "Might Not Give Up" which debuted at number 18 and 23 respectively. On February 1, 2021, the single was certified platinum by the Recording Industry Association of America (RIAA) for combined sales and streaming equivalent units of over one million units in the United States.

Charts

Certifications

Release history

References

2020 singles
2020 songs
A Boogie wit da Hoodie songs
Gunna (rapper) songs
Roddy Ricch songs
London on da Track songs
Song recordings produced by London on da Track
Songs written by Roddy Ricch
Songs written by A Boogie wit da Hoodie
Songs written by Gunna (rapper)
Songs written by London on da Track
Trap music songs